Penson is a surname. Notable persons with the surname include:

Andrew S. Penson, American businessman
César Nicolás Penson (1855–1901), Dominican author
Charlie Penson (born 1942), Canadian politician
Lillian Penson (1896–1963), English historian
Max Penson (1893–1959), Russian photojournalist
Paul Penson (1931–2006), American baseball player
Ricardo Penson (born 1952), Filipino business executive
Richard Kyrke Penson (1815–1885), Welsh architect
Thomas Penson (1790–1859), English surveyor
Thomas Mainwaring Penson (1818–1864), English architect

See also 
Julius Penson Williams
Thomas Penson De Quincey